Antonio García Ameijenda (born 11 February 1948 in Cabanas, Spain) is a Spanish former footballer and coach. He was an offensive playmaker. As a coach, he was a longtime member of the coaching staff of Hector Veira.

References

1948 births
Living people
Association football midfielders
Spanish footballers
Argentine footballers
Spanish emigrants to Argentina
San Lorenzo de Almagro footballers
UD Salamanca players
La Liga players